Charles "Charlie" Townend (birth unknown – death unknown) was a professional rugby league footballer who played in the 1890s. He played at club level for Hull F.C. (Heritage №), and was captain of Hull during the 1896–97 season.

References

External links
Search for "Townend" at rugbyleagueproject.org
 (archived by web.archive.org) Stats → Past Players → "T"
 (archived by web.archive.org) Statistics at hullfc.com

Hull F.C. captains
Hull F.C. players
Place of birth missing
Year of birth missing
English rugby league players